Inzimamul Master (born 22 April 1994) is a Botswana cricketer. He played in the 2015 ICC World Cricket League Division Six tournament. In October 2018, he represented Botswana in the Southern sub region group in the 2018–19 ICC World Twenty20 Africa Qualifier tournament.

In May 2019, he was named in Botswana's squad for the Regional Finals of the 2018–19 ICC T20 World Cup Africa Qualifier tournament in Uganda. He made his Twenty20 International (T20I) debut for Botswana against Uganda on 20 May 2019.

References

External links
 

1994 births
Living people
Botswana cricketers
Botswana Twenty20 International cricketers
Indian emigrants to Botswana
Place of birth missing (living people)